Erdős' conjecture on arithmetic progressions, often referred to as the Erdős–Turán conjecture, is a conjecture in arithmetic combinatorics (not to be confused with the Erdős–Turán conjecture on additive bases). It states that if the sum of the reciprocals of the members of a set A of positive integers diverges, then A contains arbitrarily long arithmetic progressions.

Formally, the conjecture states that if A is a large set in the sense that

then A contains arithmetic progressions of any given length, meaning that for every positive integer k there are an integer a and a non-zero integer c such that .

History

In 1936, Erdős and Turán made the weaker conjecture that any set of integers with positive natural density contains infinitely many 3 term arithmetic progressions. This was proven by Klaus Roth in 1952, and generalized to arbitrarily long arithmetic progressions by Szemerédi in 1975 in what is now known as Szemerédi's theorem. 

In a 1976 talk titled "To the memory of my lifelong friend and collaborator Paul Turán," Paul Erdős offered a prize of US$3000 for a proof of this conjecture. As of 2008 the problem is worth US$5000.

Progress and related results

Erdős' conjecture on arithmetic progressions can be viewed as a stronger version of Szemerédi's theorem.  Because the sum of the reciprocals of the primes diverges, the Green–Tao theorem on arithmetic progressions is a special case of the conjecture.

The weaker claim that A must contain infinitely many arithmetic progressions of length 3 is a consequence of an improved bound in Roth's theorem. A 2016 paper by Bloom proved that if  contains no non-trivial three-term arithmetic progressions then .

See also
 Problems involving arithmetic progressions
 List of sums of reciprocals
 List of conjectures by Paul Erdős
 Müntz–Szász theorem

References

P. Erdős: Résultats et problèmes en théorie de nombres, Séminaire Delange-Pisot-Poitou (14e année: 1972/1973), Théorie des nombres, Fasc 2., Exp. No. 24, pp. 7, 
P. Erdős and P. Turán, On some sequences of integers, J. London Math. Soc. 11 (1936), 261–264.
P. Erdős: Problems in number theory and combinatorics, Proc. Sixth Manitoba Conf. on Num. Math., Congress Numer. XVIII(1977), 35–58.
P. Erdős: On the combinatorial problems which I would most like to see solved, Combinatorica, 1(1981), 28.

External links
The Erdős–Turán conjecture or the Erdős conjecture? on MathOverflow

Combinatorics
Conjectures
Unsolved problems in mathematics